Mónica Jacqueline Falcioni Costa (born October 10, 1968) is a retired long and triple jumper from Uruguay.

Career
Falcioni represented her native country at the 2000 Summer Olympics in Sydney, Australia. There she was the flag bearer for her native country at the opening ceremony.

Achievements

References

External links
 
Sports reference biography
Profile

1968 births
Living people
Athletes (track and field) at the 2000 Summer Olympics
Athletes (track and field) at the 1999 Pan American Games
Athletes (track and field) at the 2003 Pan American Games
Uruguayan long jumpers
Uruguayan triple jumpers
Olympic athletes of Uruguay
Pan American Games competitors for Uruguay
Uruguayan people of Italian descent
Place of birth missing (living people)
Uruguayan female athletes
Female long jumpers
Female triple jumpers
South American Games gold medalists for Uruguay
South American Games silver medalists for Uruguay
South American Games medalists in athletics
Competitors at the 1998 South American Games